The Maronite Catholic Eparchy of the Annunciation  is an Eparchy of the Maronite Church immediately subject to the Holy See located in Nigeria, Benin, Togo, Cameroon, Ivory Coast, Ghana, Senegal and Angola. Its current ordinary is Eparch Simon Faddoul.

Territory and statistics

The eparchy encompasses the Maronite faithful living in West and Central Africa. Its eparchial seat is at the Our Lady of the Annunciation Cathedral in the city of Ibadan in Nigeria.

History

The eparchy was erected as the Maronite Apostolic Exarchate of Western and Central Africa by Pope Francis on 13 January 2014 with the papal bull Patrimonium ecclesiarum. Excepting eparchies of the Ethiopian Catholic Church and Eritrean Catholic Church, this was the first ecclesiastical circumscription of an Eastern Catholic Church established in Sub-Saharan Africa. The apostolic exarchate was promoted to the status of an eparchy on 28 February 2018.

Simon Faddoul, former president of Caritas of Lebanon, served as apostolic exarch without episcopal character and was chosen to become the first bishop of the eparchy when the apostolic exarchate was promoted. He has also served as apostolic visitor to the Maronite faithful in Southern Africa since his initial appointment as apostolic exarch.

Ordinaries

 Simon Faddoul (as apostolic exarch from 13 January 2014, as eparch-elect since 28 February 2018, as eparch since 7 April 2018)

References

External links
 http://www.catholic-hierarchy.org/diocese/dwcma.html
 http://www.gcatholic.org/dioceses/diocese/afri0.htm

Catholicism in Nigeria
Eastern Catholicism in Africa
Lebanese diaspora in Africa
Ibadan
Maronite Catholic eparchies